Pessinetto is a comune (municipality) in the Metropolitan City of Turin in the Italian region Piedmont, located about 35 km northwest of Turin.

Pessinetto borders the following municipalities: Monastero di Lanzo, Ceres, Mezzenile, Lanzo Torinese, Traves, and Germagnano.

References

   

Cities and towns in Piedmont